Burt Wendell Fansher (6 May 1880 – 1 April 1941) was a Progressive party member of the House of Commons of Canada who, in the 1935 federal election, ran as a Reconstruction Party candidate. He was born in Florence, Ontario and became a farmer.

Fansher attended Ontario Agricultural College.

He was first elected to Parliament at the Lambton East riding in the 1921 general election when he defeated Conservative incumbent Joseph Emmanuel Armstrong. After serving one term at Lambton East, Armstrong defeated Fansher in the 1925 election. In the 1926 election, Fansher won back the riding from Armstrong. After another term, Fansher was defeated by John Thomas Sproule of the Conservatives in the 1930 federal election.

After riding boundary changes, Fansher made one more attempt to return to the House of Commons at the newly configured Lambton—Kent riding in the 1935 federal election. On this occasion, Fansher ran as a Reconstruction Party candidate but both he and Sproule lost to Hugh MacKenzie of the Liberals.

References

External links
 

1880 births
1941 deaths
Canadian farmers
Members of the House of Commons of Canada from Ontario
Progressive Party of Canada MPs
Reconstruction Party of Canada politicians